Kikkan Randall (born December 31, 1982) is an American, Olympic champion cross-country skier. She has won 17 U.S. National titles, made 29 podiums on the World Cup, made five trips to the Winter Olympic Games and had the highest finish by an individual American woman at the World Championships, second in the Sprint in Liberec in 2009. She was the first American female cross-country skier to take a top ten finish in World Cup competition, to win a World Cup race and to win a World Cup discipline title. She won the silver medal in the individual sprint at the FIS Nordic World Ski Championships 2009 in Liberec, becoming the first American woman to win a medal in cross country skiing at the FIS Nordic World Ski Championships, and in 2013 teamed up with Jessie Diggins to win the first ever American FIS Nordic World Ski Championships gold medal in the team sprint. She and Diggins won the United States' first ever cross-country skiing gold medal at the Winter Olympics in women's team sprint at Pyeongchang in 2018.

Early years
Randall's parents, Ronn and Deborah (née Haines) originally met at a California ski resort. Kikkan's name was the result of a compromise between her parents: her father wanted to name her Kikki, after Kiki Cutter, the first American to win a race on the Alpine Skiing World Cup, whilst her mother wanted to name her Meghan. Ronn started teaching Kikkan to ski one day after her first birthday. She is the niece of former cross-country skiing Olympians Betsy Haines (1980) and Chris Haines (1976).

Randall lived in Salt Lake while her mother attended law school at the University of Utah. In the mid-1980s, she moved to Anchorage, Alaska with her parents, where her younger siblings, Tanner and Kalli were born. Originally she had ambitions to race as an alpine skier, as well as to run for an NCAA Division I college. She ran a 6:06 minute mile in sixth grade at Scenic Park Elementary, but Kikkan's goal was to run a five-minute mile by high school. Kikkan Randell wanted to attend East High school because she wanted to wear red and blue just like her mom and aunt and that lead to Randall winning 10 state titles at East Anchorage High School — seven in track and three in cross-country running. She was announced the fastest girl on skies and she is the last Alaskan state speed-skiing champion. Randall took up cross-country skiing in 1998, when her track coach suggested using it as a means of keeping fit during the winter.

Skiing career

Early career
After completing High School in Anchorage, Alaska at East High school, Kikkan Randall decided to stay in her home town, Anchorage to start her undergraduate studies and train with Alaska Pacific University Nordic Ski Center to start her new beginning. Her sixth-place finish in the sprint at the 2001 Junior World Championships was the best ever result by an American woman. Randall made her Olympic debut as a 19-year-old at the 2002 Winter Olympics in Salt Lake City and finished 44th in the inaugural Olympic individual sprint. In January 2006, Randall returned to Soldier Hollow, Utah, the site of the 2002 Olympic cross-country competition, and won national titles in the 5-kilometer freestyle, the 10-km classical and the sprint. At the 2005 World Championships in Oberstdorf, Germany, she finished 30th in the individual sprint.

2006–2011
At the 2006 Winter Olympics, Randall finished ninth in the Olympic Sprint, the best ever Olympic result in cross-country skiing by an American woman. Shortly thereafter, she finished fifth in a World Cup sprint. On January 21, 2007, she captured bronze in the women's 1.2-kilometer sprint in Rybinsk, Russia, the best ever cross-country World Cup result by an American woman. Later that calendar year, in the following season, she took the first World Cup win for an American female skier since the introduction of women's competition in 1978 in another 1.2 kilometre sprint at the same venue.

Kikkan won a silver medal in February 2009, at the Nordic Skiing World Championship for the 1.3 Kilometer sprint; she was the first American to take home a World Championship medal since Bill Koch's win in 1982. In January 2010, Randall qualified for the 2010 Winter Olympics, where she earned a US best finish of sixth in the team sprint and her best individual finish of eighth in the individual sprint event. In the 2010-11 season, she finished third in the Sprint World Cup standings.

2011–2012
Randall became the first American woman to win a World Cup discipline title in cross-country by topping the season's Sprint standings. Her season included wins in the World Cup freestyle sprints in Düsseldorf and Davos. She also finished fifth in the Overall World Cup that season.

2012–2013

Randall won four World Cup freestyle sprint events, in Quebec, Val Mustair, Sochi, and Lahti. She also won the 3 km freestyle prologue of the Tour de Ski in Oberhof. She won a team freestyle sprint in Quebec with teammate Jessie Diggins. Randall finished first in the final World Cup sprint standings and third in the overall standings. Third place was the highest ever by a U.S. woman at the time.  Randall, with Diggins, won the first-ever team sprint gold for U.S. women at the World Ski Championships.

2013–2014
Randall qualified for the U.S. Olympic team at Sochi, and went into the 2014 Winter Olympics as heavily favored to win the USA's first medal in cross-country skiing since 1976, but missed qualifying to advance in the sprint quarterfinals by .05 of a second. Subsequently, she suggested that her focus on peaking for the Olympics was disrupted by a back injury which she sustained whilst training in Davos in December 2013.

Randall topped the overall World Cup sprint standings for a third time. She won the World Cup freestyle sprint events in Nove Mesto, Szklarska Poreba, and Lahti.

2014–2015
Randall placed third in the Lahti freestyle sprint.

In October 2015 Randall announced that she was expecting her first child in April, and would take leave from competition in the 2015-16 season before returning in 2016-17 with a focus on the 2017 World Championships in Lahti and the 2018 Winter Olympics in Pyeongchang.

2016–2017
Upon returning to competition, Randall did not advance beyond qualifying in the first two World Cup Sprint competitions of the season. However, she made steady progress, and in January 2017 finished fifth in a World Cup Sprint in Falun, Sweden. Subsequently, at the 2017 World Nordic Ski Championships in Lahti, Finland, Randall took the bronze medal in the freestyle sprint, catching Hanna Falk in the last 100 metres to pip her for third place by 0.1 seconds, one place behind team-mate Diggins in second.

2017–2018
In December 2017 Randall took her first World Cup podium finish in almost three years when she finished third in a sprint in Davos, Switzerland.

During the 2018 Winter Olympics, she and Jessie Diggins became the first American cross-country skiers to win a gold medal by winning the women's team sprint at the Alpensia Cross-Country Centre in Pyeongchang, South Korea.

Cross-country skiing results
All results are sourced from the International Ski Federation (FIS).

Olympic Games
 1 medal – (1 gold)

World Championships
 3 medals – (1 gold, 1 silver, 1 bronze)

World Cup

Season titles
 3 titles – (3 sprint)

Season standings

Individual podiums
 13 victories – (11 , 2 ) 
 29 podiums – (22 , 7 )

Team podiums
 1 victory – (1 ) 
 5 podiums – (2 , 3 )

Other achievements
In 2009, Randall was elected to the International Ski Federation's Athletes Commission, which she served on for eight years. Subsequently, in 2018 she was elected to the International Olympic Committee's Athletes Commission, succeeding American ice hockey player Angela Ruggiero.

Randall defeated teammate Holly Brooks to win the Mount Marathon Race in 2011, following in the footsteps of her mother Debbie (who won the Race in 1975) and aunt Betsy (who won it three years in succession from 1979 to 1981).

Randall was inducted into the Alaska Sports Hall of Fame in 2011.

Personal life
Randall was married to former Canadian ski racer Jeff Ellis. They divorced in October 2021. The couple have a son, Breck, who was born in April 2016.

In April 2008 she was diagnosed with the genetic blood clotting disorder Factor V Leiden after being hospitalized twice due to blood clots in her left leg.

Randall mixes studies at Alaska Pacific University with skiing for the APU Nordic Ski Center program run by former national-level ski racer, Erik Flora.

In April 2018, Randall was diagnosed with breast cancer. She announced her diagnosis in July of that year on her social media accounts, as well as her plans to return to Anchorage to undergo chemotherapy.

References

External links

USOC profile
U.S. Ski Team Bio

1982 births
Alaska Pacific University alumni
American female cross-country skiers
Cross-country skiers at the 2002 Winter Olympics
Cross-country skiers at the 2006 Winter Olympics
Cross-country skiers at the 2010 Winter Olympics
Cross-country skiers at the 2014 Winter Olympics
Cross-country skiers at the 2018 Winter Olympics
FIS Nordic World Ski Championships medalists in cross-country skiing
Living people
Medalists at the 2018 Winter Olympics
Olympic cross-country skiers of the United States
Olympic gold medalists for the United States in cross-country skiing
Olympic medalists in cross-country skiing
Tour de Ski skiers
Sportspeople from Anchorage, Alaska
Skiers from Salt Lake City
International Olympic Committee members
21st-century American women